The Legend of Maula Jatt is a 2022 Pakistani Punjabi-language action drama film directed and written by Bilal Lashari. The film is an adaptation of the 1979 cult classic film Maula Jatt but it is considered neither a remake nor a sequel by the producers. Produced by Ammara Hikmat and Asad Jamil Khan under the production banner of Lashari Films and Encyclomedia. It is based on the characters and stories by Nasir Adeeb. The film stars Fawad Khan as the titular character with Hamza Ali Abbasi, Humaima Malik, Faris Shafi and Mahira Khan. In the film, a local folk hero named Maula Jatt takes on his archnemesis and the leader of a brutal clan, Noori Natt.

Development of a Maula Jatt remake was announced in December 2013 by director Bilal Lashari who completed a script treatment for the film a year later. Asad Jamil Khan and Ammara Hikmat came on board as producers in November 2016, with Hamza Ali Abbasi and Fawad Khan signing on as lead actors. Principal photography began in January 2017 and concluded in June 2019. The film was initially scheduled for theatrical release during multiple dates in 2019–2020, but kept getting delayed due to the copyright related issues and the COVID-19 pandemic. The film has been described as the most expensive film of Pakistan to date. The film music score is composed by Sarmad Ghafoor.

The Legend of Maula Jatt premiered at Cue Cinemas in Lahore on October 12, 2022 and was released theatrically on October 13, 2022. The film received positive reviews from critics for its direction, performances, action sequences, and visual effects. It has grossed over $10 million worldwide, surpassing Jawani Phir Nahi Ani 2's entire theatrical run and breaking numerous box-office records, and became the highest-grossing Pakistani film of all time as well as the highest-grossing Punjabi-language film of all time.

Plot 
The film opens with Jeeva Natt with his clan, launching an attack on Haveli of Sardar Jatt. Despite being larger in number, they are overpowered and Sardar Jatt and his wife are killed. Maula, the son of Sardar Jatt and the sole survivor of the attack, is raised by a woman named Daani. One day Mooda, the actual son of Daani, takes Maula to his coach, who teaches wrestling. Mooda’s coach gets impressed by Maula and agrees on teaching him.

Maula grows up to be a wrestler and becomes famous, but at night he struggles with violent dreams of his past. He has no clear memory of his family and past.

Maakha Natt, the son of Jeeva Natt, terrorizes the village of Maula by kidnapping a girl from his village and raping her several time in his haveli. Jeeva Natt, because of his old age, decides that he will declare someone else as the leader of his clan, but Daaro Natt, the daughter of Jeeva Natt, declares that only Noori Natt, the elder son of Jeeva Natt who is in prison because of his killing obsession, will become the ruler of the clan.

Before a fight, Maula is approached by an old man who tells him that he has the answer to Maula’s every question. He also tells Maula to meet him in the ruins of Sardar Jatt’s haveli. That night, Maula is heavily intoxicated and loses a fight for the first time in his life, but is saved by Mooda who is badly injured in the process. The next day, Maula arrives at the ruins of Sardar Jatt’s haveli where the old man, who was waiting for him to arrive, reveals to him that he is the son of Sardar Jatt. The old man then hands him the 'Gandasa' of his father. Maula arrives back to his village, only to find men of the Natt clan terrorising the village once again. Maula, in rage, kills all the men. When Maakha comes to Maula’s village to investigate the killing of his men, he is humiliated and defeated by Maula.

When Maakha returns home to plot his revenge, his sister Daaro is incensed upon hearing what he has to tell her. She berates him and moves to kill him but before she can do so, Maakha jumps off a ledge taking his own life. The Natt clan now try to avenge the humiliation that Maula Jatt has caused them. Meanwhile Maula Jatt tries to convince the villagers to stand up against the cruelty they face, while the villagers insist that he has brought death upon them all in the form of the wrath of the Natt clan.

When Noori Natt, immensely skilled in combat, gets out of jail, he tells the jailor that he has run out of competition and now wants a worthy opponent. He is soon made aware of Maula, who has become well-known for his fighting capabilities.

Upon everyone’s request, Maula agrees to apologise to the Natt clan for the safety of the villagers but as soon as he leaves the village, Noori arrives in search of Maula. When confronted by Noori, Moodha who is unaware of Noori's identity tells him that it was he who humilated his brother. Noori upon hearing this, easily bests Moodha in combat and despite pleas from Moodha's mother, kills him. Maula returns and finds Moodha dead. He then swears to kill Noori. Maula arrives at Natt’s heveli to challenge Noori in combat, but is ambushed and captured by Jeeva Natt. Noori accuses his father of taking away his competition and kills him. Noori then declares Daaro as the leader of the clan, but she is betrayed and killed by her own clan who then frame Maula for killing her.. When Noori finds out about the death of his sister, he burns down Maula’s village and captures everyone. Maula arrives at the village and fights Noori. At the end Noori is killed and Maula is declared the hero of the village.

Cast
 Fawad Khan as Maula Jatt
 Rehan Fareed Hiraj as Young Maula
 Hamza Ali Abbasi as Noori Natt
 Mahira Khan as Mukhoo Jattni 
 Humaima Malik as Daaro Nattni
 Gohar Rasheed as Maakha Natt
 Faris Shafi as Mooda
 Shafqat Cheema as Jeeva Natt
 Saima Baloch as Rajjo
 Nayyer Ejaz as Jagoo Natt
 Ali Azmat as Gogi
 Babar Ali as Sardar Jatt (Maula’s father)
 Resham as Malika Jatt (Maula’s mother)
 Zia Khan as Ali (loyalist of Sardar Jatt)
 Kamran Lashari as Narrator
 Raheela Agha as Daani (Mooda's mother and Maula Jatt's foster mother)

Production

Development
On 14 December 2013 in an interview with The Express Tribune, Bilal Lashari announced that he will be directing Maula Jatt and said: "This will be my take on gandasa films which are blamed for the death of Lollywood. I think the gandasa genre was a missed opportunity for Pakistani cinema, and what better choice to utilize it then by paying homage to the cult classic Maula Jatt." To mold himself in the role, Hamza Ali Abbasi started training to work on muscle symmetry, proportion, endurance and cardiovascular health.

On 4 April 2014, Lashari announced that he had just finished the script of film and looking up for lead cast. He said, "Waar was appreciated for its stylistic elements, but was criticized for its script, which is why I want to spend more time on Maula Jatt'''s script." On 27 May 2014, the cast was chosen and the shooting of film was started revealing that film will be in three languages; English, Urdu and Punjabi.

 Casting and filming 
The film cast was revealed individually by Hamza Ali Abbasi. On advice of Bilal Lashari, on 16 November 2016, Adnan Jaffar and Shamoon Abbasi were removed from these cast after Asad Jamil Khan and Ammara Hikmat took over the project. In March 2015, Lashari announced that he is about to start the film shooting initially from Lahore. He revealed that film's story will be all new unlike the first part, but dialogues will be taken from 1979 film. On 8 January 2016, it was revealed that Fawad Khan will play the role of Maula Jatt opposite to Noori Nath played by Hamza Ali Abbasi. The film is shot with the Red Epic W camera.

 Release 
A trailer for the film was released on 21 December 2018 to a positive reaction with a release date of Eid ul-Fitr 2019. However, due to a copyright lawsuit filed by the producer of the 1979 movie, the release was postponed. A settlement was reached between the two parties in February 2020, after which the film was scheduled to be released in Pakistan and China simultaneously on Eid Al Fitr 2020, but was postponed indefinitely due to the COVID-19 pandemic.

In July 2022, it was rumored that the film would be released on 30 September 2022.
After multiple delays, it was officially announced that the film would be released on October 13, 2022.

 Reception 
Box office
As of 13 December 2022, The Legend of Maula Jatt made in budget of 45cr ($2.0M)-55cr ($2.4M) has grossed PKR 91.31cr ($4.06M) in Pakistan, and PKR 146.69cr ($6.52M) in other territories, for a worldwide total of PKR 238.9cr ($10.6M), breaking numerous box-office records including becoming the highest-grossing Pakistani film of all time (surpassing Jawani Phir Nahi Ani 2 (2018) entire theatrical run, as well as the biggest-highest-grossing film of all time in Pakistan and the only Pakistani film to pass the 100 crore, 150 crore and 200 crore milestone.

The film had a worldwide opening of Rs. 51.00 crore (US$2.3 million), the biggest Pakistan-film opening of all time and nearly double  Jawani Phir Nahi Ani 2's previous record of 25.02 crore. It is also the fastest Pakistan film ever to eclipse the 20cr, 30cr, 40cr and 50 cr mark, in just three to four days weekend. On 20 October, the film's earnings at the global box office passed the entire theatrical run of JPNA 2 and became the fastest Pakistani film ever to gross more than 70 crore worldwide, amassing the amount in only one week. It also became the only film to surpass the threshold of 100 crore, 150 crore and 200 crore worldwide, within a month.

 Pakistan The Legend of Maula Jatt earned 11.30 crore in its opening weekend, surpassing Sultan and JPNA 2 to become the second biggest opening weekend of all time in Pakistan only behind Avengers: Endgame (14.50 crore), and the biggest opening weekend of 2022 in Pakistan (surpassing London Nahi Jaunga and Doctor Strange 2). The film opened on Friday and grossed 4.5 crore (including 1.75 crore from Thursday night previews) the highest ever opening day in Pakistan. It then collected 3.45 crore on Saturday and 3.35 crore on Sunday the highest grossed Saturday and Sunday ever.

The film then made 2.1 crore on Monday (the second highest non-holiday Monday)  and then all time highest Tuesday gross of 2.2 crore. In its second weekend the film made PKR 9.11cr (the biggest second weekend of all time in Pakistan beating Avengers: Endgame) for a 10-day total of 29.41 crore. It was the fastest film to ever pass the 30 crore million milestone in Pakistan in just 11 days, beating Endgame and JPNA2. The film hit 97.91 crore in its 11th weekend and 110.29 crore on its 19th weekend.

 Other territories 
Internationally, the film made record $355K from United Kingdom, the highest opening weekend for any Pakistani or Punjabi film kicking off at No.9 of the box office charts.The film largest overseas opening in UAE where it reached No. 1 with over $515,000. In the US and Canada, the film grossed $290K and $235K respectively, and in Australia it grossed $160,000. In both Canada and Australia, the film opened at No. 6 on the box office charts. Other releasing markets included Norway, Germany, Netherlands, Spain and South East Asia where it collectively grossed $250,000 in the opening weekend. Overall, the film debuted to $1.7 million (40 crore) on the overseas opening weekend, the highest for a Pakistani film. By its 5th weekend, the film had grossed £1.3 million at the UK box office.

Critical response
Cath Clarke of The Guardian called the film "Game of Thrones meets Gladiator" and gave it 3 out of 5 stars, writing "The movie ends, unsurprisingly, with a big fight between Maula and Noori – a fight in which Maula pauses to twiddle his fine moustache. Like I said, old school; still, I enjoyed every minute." Writing for The Express Tribune, Rafay Mahmood And Zeeshan Ahmad rated the film 4 out of 5 stars saying "While the film borrows nothing but the characters and bits of plot from the original, the themes it quite bravely endorses in this day and age call for a broader study of a shared sense of masculinity and rethinking of the box office prospects of South Indian cinema in Pakistan, in a better political climate of course." Eleen Bukhari of Geo News said "A lot of ups and downs, delays and legal setbacks later, TLoMJ has lived up to, if not surpassed expectations. It is an initiative never seen in Pakistan before. It is truly a labour of love."

Conversely, Carla Hay of Culture Mix gave a negative review, writing ″The problem is that “The Legend of Maula Jatt” filmmakers didn’t care enough about casting skilled actors who can say dialogue in a talented and believable way. The acting in “The Legend of Maula Jatt” is absolutely cringeworthy—either too flat or too exaggerated. Worst of all, there’s no suspense or any real surprises in this long-winded action film, because everything in the movie plays out like a formulaic “heroes versus villains” video game that is a lazy imitation of better ones that came before it.″

Mahira Khan's performance was less well received. Syed Zain Raza, writing for The Friday Times stated "One can’t deny the star power of Mahira, but it would be better to say that this wasn’t her film. Mukkho wasn’t meant for her. The contrast is even clearer when one compares her to Humaima who was flawless in this film." Marsha Tayyab, sub editor of Dawn Images wrote "One thing that did put me off was Mahira Khan’s Mukkho. The supporting character to Maula was rather bland and to top it all off, Mahira’s Punjabi didn’t cut it for me. I would’ve liked to see Mehwish Hayat as Maula’s love interest instead, as Ms. Marvel gave us a glimpse of Hayat and Fawad’s sizzling chemistry." while Siham Basir, the Managing editor of Dawn Images wrote "The only downside for me was Mahira Khan’s Mukkho. Her Punjabi accent needed a lot of work and while I understand the need for star power and the casting of non-Punjabis for the film, it took years for the movie to be completed. She could have used those years to work on her accent and delivery because her performance fell flat.

 Lawsuit 
In 2017, Muhammad Sarwar Bhatti, the producer of the 1979 film Maula Jatt, filed a suit before the Intellectual Property Organization of Pakistan tribunal seeking an injunctive order against the exhibition of The Legend of Maula Jatt. In 2019, he also submitted multiple applications for a stay order in Lahore High Court to prohibit the producer and director of the new movie from using material which may violate his intellectual property.

Responding to these claims, producer Ammara Hikmat said, "the malicious claims made by Sarwar Bhatti are false and frivolous" and hinted at taking the matter to court since Nasir Adeeb, the writer of the 1979 film, had officially handed over the rights of his characters – including Maula Jatt and Noori Natt (among others) – to director Bilal Lashari and Hikmat.

On 9 February 2020, after a lengthy legal battle, a settlement was reached between the two parties. Bhatti was recognized as the exclusive copyright and trademark owner of the 1979 movie. However, he gave permission to the filmmakers of the new movie to use the content from his original work and agree to withdraw all other court petitions regarding its release. This agreement was confined to the production, release, promotion, and distribution of The Legend of Maula Jatt and did not apply to any future movies that may violate the rights of the old movie, which were retained by Bahoo Films. Similarly, Bahoo Films would have to record a statement before the Intellectual Property Tribunal, Lahore, declaring that the matter had been resolved and that Ammara Hikmat's Encylomedia PR was allowed to use the content of Maula Jatt for the upcoming movie.
Sequel
After it's massive success, the producers announced that a sequel titled The Legend Of Maula Jatt: Chapter II'' is in development.

See also 
List of Pakistani films of 2022
List of 2022 box office number-one films in Pakistan
List of Pakistani Punjabi-language films

References

External links 
 

Punjabi-language Pakistani films
Pakistani action drama films
Remakes of Pakistani films
Films directed by Bilal Lashari
Films shot in Lahore
Films set in Punjab, Pakistan
Geo Films films
Works subject to a lawsuit
Films postponed due to the COVID-19 pandemic